Olivier Milloud is a retired French rugby union footballer, who last played for Stade Français in the Top 14. He has also played for the France national team, including being a part of their 2003 Rugby World Cup squad. He usually plays as a prop.

He made his international debut for France in a match against Romania on 28 May 2000. He had surgery on his ankle in 2003, though he recovered in time to be named in France's squad for the 2003 Rugby World Cup. He played in five matches during the tournament in Australia. Although he did not play in the 2004 Six Nations Championship, he played three matches in 2005 and then played in France's summer and autumn internationals. He scored his first try for the France national team against Scotland on 17 March 2007 during the last match of the 2007 Six Nations Championship, which saw them win the title.

References

External links
 Olivier Milloud on sporting-heroes.net
 Olivier Milloud on ercrugby.com
 Olivier Milloud on rwc2003.irb.com
 Olivier Milloud on rbs6nations.com

1975 births
Living people
Sportspeople from Drôme
French rugby union players
Rugby union props
France international rugby union players